Aspidytes is a genus of aquatic beetles in the family Aspidytidae, first recorded in 2002 from specimens in South Africa. The genus contains the single species Aspidytes niobe. Originally a second species from China was placed in the same genus but has later been transferred to Sinaspidytes. The aquatic beetle is 6.5 - 7.2 mm long and lives in hygropetric habitats.

References

Adephaga
Monotypic Adephaga genera